Lebohang K. Moleko is a Lesotho diplomat. He has served as Lesotho's Ambassador to the United States and as Permanent Representative to the United Nations in New York. He served as President of the UNICEF Executive Board at the international level in 2004.

References

Ambassadors of Lesotho to the United States
Chairmen and Presidents of UNICEF
Permanent Representatives of Lesotho to the United Nations
Year of birth missing (living people)
Living people
Lesotho officials of the United Nations